Abad is a village and municipality in the Agdash Rayon of Azerbaijan. It has a population of 1,716.

References 

Populated places in Agdash District